Rik Waddon (born 27 February 1977) is a Professional Paralympic British road and track racing cyclist and Paralympian.

Waddon is a brain injury survivor, after being involved in a bicycle accident at the age of five. This resulted in physical disabilities, memory loss and recurring fatigue.

He won silver medals in the Beijing 2008 and London 2012 Paralympics.

Waddon married the Paralympic swimmer Natalie Jones in 2010. They are each the subject of a Lego minifigure.

His autobiography, A Saving Grace was published in January 2021.

Bibliography

References

External links 

 

1977 births
Living people
English male cyclists
Paralympic cyclists of Great Britain
Cyclists at the 2008 Summer Paralympics
Cyclists at the 2012 Summer Paralympics
Paralympic silver medalists for Great Britain
Sportspeople from Chester
Medalists at the 2008 Summer Paralympics
Medalists at the 2012 Summer Paralympics
Paralympic medalists in cycling